The Fresh Vegetable Mystery is a 1939 Color Classics cartoon. It was released on September 29, 1939.

Plot

It’s late at night in the kitchen, and all the vegetables are asleep when a cloaked figure arrives and kidnaps Mother Carrot and her kids.

References

1939 animated films
1939 films
Short films directed by Dave Fleischer
Color Classics cartoons
Fruit and vegetable characters
1930s animated short films
Fleischer Studios short films
Paramount Pictures short films
1930s American films